Pochard is a common name used for several species of diving ducks:
Four species in the genus Aythya:
 Common pochard, Aythya ferina
 Baer's pochard, Aythya baeri
 Ferruginous pochard, Aythya nyroca
 Madagascar pochard, Aythya innotata
 Three species in the genus Netta:
 Red-crested pochard, Netta rufina
 Rosy-billed pochard or Rosybill, Netta peposaca
 Southern pochard, Netta erythrophthalma